The National Federation of Textiles was a trade union representing workers in the textile industry in France.

The union was founded on 15 February 1948, by former members of the National Federation of Textile Industry Workers who objected to the influence of the French Communist Party in that union.  The union affiliated to Workers' Force and the International Federation of Textile Workers' Associations, and by 1954, it claimed 18,000 members.

Over time, membership of the union fell, along with employment in the industry.  In 1978, it merged with the General Federation of Hides and Skins and Clothing, to form the Federation of Textiles, Hides and Skins and Clothing.

General Secretaries
1948: Maurice Vanhonacker and Ernest Vigreux
1948: Ernest Vigreux
1952: Maurice Mercier and Ernest Vigreux
1963: Maurice Mercier
1972: Francis Desrousseaux

References

Textile and clothing trade unions
Trade unions in France
Trade unions established in 1948
Trade unions disestablished in 1978